Andrew Stuart Lewis (born 6 July 1976) is an English cricketer. He is a right-handed batsman who played for Hertfordshire. He was born in Enfield.

Lewis, who made a single appearance in the Second XI Championship for Middlesex at the age of 16, made his debut for Hertfordshire in the Minor Counties Championship in 2003 - and made his only List A appearance for the team in the C&G Trophy in August 2003.

Lewis is still playing for Hertfordshire in the Minor Counties Championship as of 2011 & he has been Captain since talking over from David Ward in 2006.

External links
Andy Lewis at Cricket Archive 
2007 Championship Top Runs Scorers

1976 births
Living people
English cricketers
Hertfordshire cricketers
People from Enfield, London